Eva Karin Nyberg (born 8 February 1969 in Funbo, Uppsala) is a former Swedish Olympic freestyle swimmer. She competed in the 1988 Summer Olympics and in the 1992 Summer Olympics. Her best individual result is 19th place in the 100 m freestyle in 1992. She also swum a final with the 1992 4×100 m freestyle relay team finishing 7th.

Clubs
Mariestads SS

References
 

1969 births
Living people
Swimmers at the 1988 Summer Olympics
Swimmers at the 1992 Summer Olympics
Olympic swimmers of Sweden
European Aquatics Championships medalists in swimming
Mariestads SS swimmers
Swedish female freestyle swimmers
Sportspeople from Uppsala